Heliozela ahenea is a moth of the Heliozelidae family. It was described by Walsingham in 1897, and is found in the West Indies.

The wingspan is about 4 mm. The forewings are brassy metallic without markings. The hindwings and cilia are purplish grey.

References

Moths described in 1897
Heliozelidae